{{DISPLAYTITLE:C21H24O10}}
The molecular formula C21H24O10 (molar mass: 436.41 g/mol, exact mass: 436.136947 u) may refer to:

 Nothofagin, a C-linked phloretin glucoside
 Phlorizin, an O-linked phloretin glucoside

Molecular formulas